Just Like That may refer to:

Just Like That (novel), a 1994 novel by Lily Brett 
Just Like That, a 2021 novel by Gary D. Schmidt
"Just Like That", a catchphrase, a single, and a 1975 autobiography of comedian and magician Tommy Cooper, and two tribute shows dedicated to him

Music
"Just Like That" (Gemini song), a song by Gemini, written by ABBA
"Just Like That" (Tommy Cooper song)
"Just Like That", a song by Colbie Caillat, from the album Gypsy Heart
"Just Like That", a song by Mims, from the album Music Is My Savior
"Just Like That", a song by Bun B featuring Young Jeezy, from the album Trill OG
"Just Like That", a song by Monrose, from the album Strictly Physical
"Just Like That", a song by April Wine, from the album Electric Jewels
"Just Like That", a 1964 song by Joe Brown
"Just Like That", a 1959 song by The Robins
Just Like That, a 1980 album by Toots and the Maytals
Just Like That..., a 2022 album by Bonnie Raitt
 "Just Like That" (Bonnie Raitt song), the title song